Palisades Park is a borough in Bergen County, in the U.S. state of New Jersey. As of the 2020 United States census, the borough's population was 20,292, an increase of 670 (+3.4%) from the 2010 census count of 19,622, which in turn reflected an increase of 2,549 (+14.9%) from the 17,073 counted in the 2000 census.

The borough of Palisades Park was created by an act of the New Jersey Legislature on March 22, 1899, from portions of Ridgefield Township. A portion of its area was annexed by the neighboring borough of Fort Lee in April 1909. The borough was named for its location atop the New Jersey Palisades.

It is one of the largest and fastest growing ethnic Korean enclaves outside of Korea. Koreans comprise the majority (65%) of the population of the borough of Palisades Park, the municipality with the highest density of ethnic Koreans in the Western Hemisphere and the home of both the highest Korean-American density and percentage of any municipality in the United States. It has been called Koreatown on the Hudson and Little Korea.

Geography 
According to the U.S. Census Bureau, the borough had a total area of 1.28 square miles (3.32 km2), including 1.24 square miles (3.21 km2) of land and 0.04 square miles (0.11 km2) of water (3.28%).

The borough borders Fort Lee, Leonia, Ridgefield and Ridgefield Park. Morsemere is a neighborhood largely in the northern part of Ridgefield straddling the southern border of Palisades Park.

The town's central business district centered around Broad Avenue has been called Koreatown In mid-2015, a proposal was submitted by the Korean-American Association of Palisades Park to the mayor and council to add a second name to Broad Avenue, such as "Korean Market Street" (Meokjagolmok) or "Korea Way".

History 
Until the 1980s, Palisades Park was overwhelmingly Caucasian, a mix of blue-collar workers and professionals whose families originated largely from Italy, Croatia, Germany, and Greece. Its houses were inexpensive, and it had a number of vacant shops and offices. In the 1990s, a continuous stream of Korean immigrants emerged into Palisades Park. A substantial number of affluent and educated Korean American professionals have settled in Bergen County since the early 2000s and have founded various academic and communally supportive  organizations, including the Korean Parent Partnership Organization at the Bergen County Academies magnet high school and the Korean-American Association of New Jersey. Approximately 120 Korean stores were counted in Palisades Park in 2000, a number which has risen significantly since then, featuring restaurants and karaoke (noraebang) bars, grocery markets, education centers and bookstores, financial institutions, offices, electronics vendors, apparel boutiques, and other commercial enterprises.

In May 2012, borough officials rejected requests by two diplomatic delegations from Japan to remove a small monument from a public park, a brass plaque on a block of stone, dedicated in 2010 to the memory of comfort women, tens of thousands of women and girls, many Korean, who were forced into sexual slavery by Japanese soldiers during World War II. Days later, a South Korean delegation endorsed the borough's decision. The first Japanese delegation cited apologies offered by their country's government for its involvement as justifying the removal of the monument, while officials from the second delegation controversially claimed that "comfort women were a lie". However, in neighboring Fort Lee, various Korean American groups could not reach consensus on the design and wording for such a monument as of early April 2013. 

In May 2014, the Palisades Park Public Library created a memorial dedicated to the victims of the tragic sinking of the Sewol ferry off the South Korean coast on April 16, 2014.

Demographics 
The per capita Korean American population of Bergen County, 6.3% by the 2010 United States Census, (increasing to 6.9% by the 2011 American Community Survey), is the highest of any county in the United States, with all of the nation's top ten municipalities by percentage of Korean population and an absolute total of 56,773 Korean Americans (increasing to 63,247 by the 2011 American Community Survey) living in the county. The concentration of Korean Americans in Palisades Park in turn is the highest of any municipality in the United States, at 52% of the population, enumerating 10,115 residents of Korean ancestry as of the 2010 Census. Palisades Park is often referred to as the Korean village. Along with Koreatowns in New York City and Long Island, Bergen County serves as the nexus for an overall Korean American population of 218,764 individuals in the Greater New York Combined Statistical Area, the second largest population of ethnic Koreans outside of Korea.

2010 census

As of the 2010 Census, 51.5% of the population (10,115) reported themselves as being of Korean ancestry, with both the highest Korean-American density and percentage of any municipality in the United States. Broad Avenue  has been characterized as a major epicenter of Korean American life. Based on data from the 2012-2016 American Community Survey, 80.9% of borough residents did not speak English as their dominant language, the third-highest percentage in the state; the Korean language is spoken at home by more than half of the residents of Palisades Park.

Same-sex couples headed 41 households in 2010, an increase from the 37 counted in 2000.

The Census Bureau's 2006–2010 American Community Survey showed that (in 2010 inflation-adjusted dollars) median household income was $55,602 (with a margin of error of +/− $7,300) and the median family income was $66,725 (+/− $8,196). Males had a median income of $43,919 (+/− $8,170) versus $46,014 (+/− $6,780) for females. The per capita income for the borough was $30,666 (+/− $2,900). About 12.0% of families and 14.4% of the population were below the poverty line, including 18.6% of those under age 18 and 15.2% of those age 65 or over.

2000 census
As of the 2000 United States census there were 17,073 people, 6,247 households, and 4,447 families residing in the borough. The population density was 14,112.4 people per square mile (5,447.9/km2). There were 6,386 housing units at an average density of 5,278.6 per square mile (2,037.7/km2). The racial makeup of the borough was 48.27% White, 1.38% African American, 0.19% Native American, 41.09% Asian, 0.03% Pacific Islander, 5.80% from other races, and 3.24% from two or more races. Hispanic or Latino of any race were 16.48% of the population.

In 2000, 36.38% of Palisades Park residents identified as being of Korean heritage. This was the highest percentage of Korean Americans of any place in the country with 1,000 or more residents identifying their ancestry and more than double that of second-ranked Cerritos, California. Also in the 2000 Census, 3.1% of Palisades Park's residents identified themselves as being of Croatian ancestry. This was the second highest percentage of people with Croatian ancestry in any place in New Jersey with 1,000 or more residents identifying their ancestry.

There were 6,247 households, out of which 30.6% had children under the age of 18 living with them, 54.9% were married couples living together, 10.4% had a female householder with no husband present, and 28.8% were non-families. 22.9% of all households were made up of individuals, and 8.1% had someone living alone who was 65 years of age or older. The average household size was 2.73 and the average family size was 3.20.

In the borough, the population was spread out, with 19.4% under the age of 18, 9.1% from 18 to 24, 37.8% from 25 to 44, 21.7% from 45 to 64, and 12.1% who were 65 years of age or older. The median age was 36 years. For every 100 females, there were 99.1 males. For every 100 females age 18 and over, there were 97.8 males.

The median income for a household in the borough was $48,015, and the median income for a family was $54,503. Males had a median income of $37,204 versus $31,997 for females. The per capita income for the borough was $22,607. About 8.5% of families and 9.7% of the population were below the poverty line, including 9.9% of those under age 18 and 12.1% of those age 65 or over.

Government

Local government 
Palisades Park is governed under the Borough form of New Jersey municipal government, which is used in 218 municipalities (of the 564) statewide, making it the most common form of government in New Jersey. The government is comprised of a mayor and a borough council comprising six council members, with all positions elected at-large on a partisan basis as part of the November general election. A mayor is elected directly by the voters to a four-year term of office. The Borough Council is comprised of six members elected to serve three-year terms on a staggered basis, with two seats coming up for election each year in a three-year cycle. The borough form of government used by Palisades Park is a "weak mayor / strong council" government in which council members act as the legislative body with the mayor presiding at meetings and voting only in the event of a tie. The mayor can veto ordinances subject to an override by a two-thirds majority vote of the council. The mayor makes committee and liaison assignments for council members, and most appointments are made by the mayor with the advice and consent of the council.

In July 2015 Gina S. Kim became the borough's municipal clerk, reflecting the growing political influence of the Korean American population. Korean Americans, who compose more than half of the borough's population and have attended town meetings in large numbers, have requested Korean interpreters to be present at these meetings as of August 2016. In 2017, the borough created a Korean language version of its website.

, the Mayor of Palisades Park is Democrat Chong "Paul" Kim, whose term of office ends December 31, 2026. His predecessor, Christopher Chung, was the first Korean-American mayor in Bergen County, and second ever in New Jersey. Members of the Palisades Park Borough Council are Council President Cynthia A. Pirrera (D, 2023), Stephanie S. Jang (R, 2024), Son K. "Andy" Min (D, 2025), Suk Min (D, 2024; appointed to serve an unexpired term), Jae K. Park (R, 2023) and Michael P. Vietri (D, 2025).

After Chong "Paul" Kim took office as mayor in January 2023, the borough council declined to pick from one of the three candidates nominated by the Democratic municipal committee and chose Andy Min to fill the council seat he had held expiring in December 2024, after which the Democratic committee chose Suk Min to fill the seat. With two people chosen to fill the seat, the Democratic committee and a group of three elected officials prevailed in a suit, with a judge deciding to give the vacant seat to Suk Min.

During the 2018 primary election for mayor, former Mayor James Rotundo's mother Lorraine Rotundo went on a "racist tirade" on Facebook two days after the primary election. The race was extremely close with Christopher Chung winning by a narrow margin. Lorraine Rotundo made the post in response to the massive number of Koreans at the voting booths. She stated that Palisades Park should "go to hell," and said that the Korean residents could "have this F'n town." She later went on to post that only English should be spoken in the Borough Hall. Former Mayor James Rotundo apologized on behalf of his mother and strongly denounced her comments. "I'm disgusted with her statement," he said. Rotundo claimed that he was not raised by these sentiments.

Christopher Chung was sworn into office as a council member in January 2014, having been selected by the council from among three names submitted by the Democratic Municipal Committee to fill the vacant seat of Jason Kim, who had resigned earlier that month.

Federal, state, and county representation 
Palisades Park is located in the 5th Congressional District and is part of New Jersey's 37th state legislative district.

In redistricting following the 2010 census, the borough was in the 9th congressional district, which was in effect from 2013 to 2022.

Politics 
As of March 2011, there were 6,410 registered voters, of which 1,839 (28.7% vs. 31.7% countywide) were registered as Democrats, 1,128 (17.6% vs. 21.1%) were registered as Republicans and 3,443 (53.7% vs. 47.1%) were registered as Unaffiliated. There were no voters registered to other parties. Among the borough's 2010 Census population, 32.7% (vs. 57.1% in Bergen County) were registered to vote, including 39.1% of those ages 18 and over (vs. 73.7% countywide).

In the 2012 presidential election, Democrat Barack Obama received 2,487 votes here (67.1% vs. 54.8% countywide), ahead of Republican Mitt Romney with 1,147 votes (31.0% vs. 43.5%), for a turnout of 53.5% (vs. 70.4% in Bergen County).

In the 2013 gubernatorial election, Republican Chris Christie received 50.6% of the vote (919 cast), ahead of Democrat Barbara Buono with 47.6% (864 votes), and other candidates with 1.8% (33 votes), among the 1,878 ballots cast by the borough's 6,473 registered voters (62 ballots were spoiled), for a turnout of 29.0%.

Culture 
Palisades Park has emerged as a dominant nexus of Korean American culture. Palisades Park High School has hosted national Kumdo martial arts tournaments.

Broad Avenue has been referred to as a "Korean food walk of fame", with diverse offerings. Palisades Park now incorporates the highest concentration of Korean restaurants within a one-mile radius in the United States, and Broad Avenue has evolved into a Korean dessert destination as well. Korean Chinese cuisine is now also available in Koreatown, as is misugaru. Bulgogi and galbi are staples on Broad Avenue in the Palisades Park. Korean cafés have become a major cultural element within Palisades Park, not only for the coffee, bingsu (shaved ice), and pastries, but also as communal gathering places.

Korean and English are both spoken prevalently in Palisades Park. Korean is spoken at home by more than half of the residents of Palisades Park and nearby Englewood Cliffs, according to U.S. Census Bureau data released in 2017. Retail signs using Hangul  are ubiquitous. In 1996, an ordinance was passed that storefront signage be same size in English as in Korean.

Additionally, as of 2010, more than 15 percent of Palisades Park’s residents speak Spanish.

Education 
The Palisades Park Public School District serves students in pre-kindergarten through twelfth grade.  As of the 2019–20 school year, the district, comprised of three schools, had an enrollment of 1,846 students and 95.7 classroom teachers (on an FTE basis), for a student–teacher ratio of 19.3:1. Schools in the district (with 2019–20 enrollment data from the National Center for Education Statistics) are 
Dr. Charles R. Smith Early Childhood Center with 196 students in grades Pre-K–K, 
Lindbergh Elementary School with 858 students in grades 1–6 and 
Palisades Park High School with 774 students in grades 7–12.

Public school students from the borough, and all of Bergen County, are eligible to attend the secondary education programs offered by the Bergen County Technical Schools, which include the Bergen County Academies in Hackensack, and the Bergen Tech campus in Teterboro or Paramus. The district offers programs on a shared-time or full-time basis, with admission based on a selective application process and tuition covered by the student's home school district.

According to The Record, the Korean-American Association of New Jersey petitioned Palisades Park school officials in 2013 to use textbooks that refer to the Sea of Japan as the East Sea as well.

Transportation

Roads and highways

Roadways in Palisades Park include U.S. Route 1/9, U.S. Route 46, Route 5, Route 63, Route 93 and County Route 501.

The nearby George Washington Bridge, the world's busiest motor vehicle bridge, provides access to Palisades Park from Manhattan in New York City via adjacent Fort Lee.

Public transportation
NJ Transit provides bus service between the borough and the Port Authority Bus Terminal in Midtown Manhattan on the 127, 154, 155, 157, 166 and 168 routes, to Jersey City on the 83 route, with local service offered on the 751 and 755 bus lines.

Rockland Coaches provides service to the Port Authority Bus Terminal on routes 11T/11AT, 14ET, 20/20T and 21T and on the 14K route to the George Washington Bridge Bus Station.

Notable people

People who were born in, residents of, or otherwise closely associated with Palisades Park include:

 Barbara Bennett (1906–1958), stage and film actress and dancer
 John J. Dickerson (1900–1966), politician who served as Mayor of Palisades Park from 1939–1952, and was Chairman of the New Jersey Republican State Committee
 William J. Dorgan (1921–2003), Bergen County Freeholder Director and member of the New Jersey General Assembly who served as mayor of Palisades Park from 1960 to 1967
 Don Guardian (born 1953), politician who has represented the 2nd Legislative District in the New Jersey General Assembly since 2022
 Barbara McLean (1903–1996), film editor who won the 1944 Academy Award for Film Editing for the film Wilson
 Steven Pedulla, rhythm guitar, backing vocals for the post-hardcore band, Thursday
 Patrick J. Roma (1949–2017), lawyer and politician who represented the 38th Legislative District in the New Jersey General Assembly from 1988 to 1997
 Elaine Romagnoli (1942–2021), businesswoman and community leader who founded and ran restaurants and lesbian bars in New York City
 V. H. Viglielmo (1926–2016), scholar and translator of Japanese literature

See also
 List of U.S. cities with significant Korean-American populations

References

Sources 

 Municipal Incorporations of the State of New Jersey (according to Counties) prepared by the Division of Local Government, Department of the Treasury (New Jersey); December 1, 1958.
 Clayton, W. Woodford; and Nelson, William. History of Bergen and Passaic Counties, New Jersey, with Biographical Sketches of Many of its Pioneers and Prominent Men., Philadelphia: Everts and Peck, 1882.
 Harvey, Cornelius Burnham (ed.), Genealogical History of Hudson and Bergen Counties, New Jersey. New York: New Jersey Genealogical Publishing Co., 1900.
 Van Valen, James M. History of Bergen County, New Jersey. New York: New Jersey Publishing and Engraving Co., 1900.
 Westervelt, Frances A. (Frances Augusta), 1858–1942, History of Bergen County, New Jersey, 1630–1923, Lewis Historical Publishing Company, 1923.

External links 

 
 Palisades Park Public School District
 
 Palisades Park Public School District, National Center for Education Statistics
 Palisades Park Public Library Multimedia Center
 Palisades Park city data

 
1899 establishments in New Jersey
Borough form of New Jersey government
Boroughs in Bergen County, New Jersey
Populated places established in 1899